Marc Warren is a senior counsel in Crowell & Moring's Aviation and Administrative Law & Regulatory practice group. From 2007 until joining Crowell & Moring in April 2014, Marc Warren was the Deputy Chief Counsel for Operations at the Federal Aviation Administration. He had been assigned to the US Army's Judge Advocate General office. He was at the Center for Military Law and Operations.  He was a potential defendant in the proposed international war crimes prosecution for the Abu Ghraib and Guantanamo Bay torture scandal, undertaken by the German national Wolfgang Kaleck.

When the German Federal Prosecutor decided not to open an investigation into the international war crimes, this decision was appealed by the Center for Constitutional Rights (CCR), the International Federation for Human Rights (FIGH) and the Republican Attorneys' Association (RAV) in November 2007. However, the Stuttgart Regional Appeals Court dismissed the appeal on April 21, 2009.

Education 
Warren graduated from Berkeley Preparatory School in 1975.   He attended the University of Florida where he was a member of Florida Blue Key and President of Kappa Alpha Fraternity.  He graduated from The University of Florida with a Bachelor of Arts in Political Science in 1978.

Warren went on to earn a Juris Doctor, with honors, from the University of Florida Levin College Of Law in 1981.  While in law school, he was the Chancellor of the Student Honor Court and Chairman of the Board of Masters in the University of Florida Student Government.  He is a member of the University of Florida Hall of Fame.   He received the Claude Pepper Award for Public Service from the Phi Alpha Delta Law Fraternity.

He earned a Master of Laws in Military Law, with honors, from The Judge Advocate General's School, U.S. Army (TJAGSA) in 1993 and a Master of Science in Strategic Studies from the United States Army War College in 2002.  He is a Doctor of Juridical Science (S.J.D.) Candidate at the University of Virginia Law School in Charlottesville.

Army career 
Commissioned as an Army ROTC Distinguished Military Graduate, Warren's military schooling includes the Judge Advocate Officer Basic, Advanced, and Graduate Courses; Command and General Staff College; U.S. Army War College; and Airborne, Air Assault, Jumpmaster, Pathfinder, and High Risk SERE Schools.

Warren served as a Judge Advocate in numerous assignments in the Americas, Europe and the Middle East.  His service included deployments to Grenada, Bosnia, Kuwait and Iraq.  He served as the senior legal advisor for the 11th Armored Cavalry Regiment in Fulda, Germany, and Kuwait; Task Force Victory in Kuwait;  Joint Special Operations Command, Fort Bragg, North Carolina; 101st Airborne Division (Air Assault), Fort Campbell, Kentucky;  V Corps in Germany, Kuwait, and Iraq; Combined Joint Task Force – Seven (CJTF-&) in Iraq; and Multi-National Forces - Iraq (MNF-I).

While serving as the Chief of International and Operational Law at V Corps in Germany, Warren was the U.S. Forces Legal Liaison Officer to the trial of terrorist Mohammed Ali Hammadi, convicted of hijacking TWA Flight 847 and murdering U.S. Navy diver Robert Stethem.  He was the legal advisor to special operations forces involved in the capture of persons indicted for war crimes in the former Yugoslavia, including Serbian General Radislav Krstic, the first person to be convicted of genocide by the International Criminal Tribunal for the former Yugoslavia (ICTY) for the massacre at Srebrenica.  Warren served on the faculty of the International and Operational Law Department of TJAGSA.   He was named the Outstanding Young Army Lawyer by the American Bar Association and received the Clayton B. Burton Award of Excellence from the Military Law Committee of the Florida Bar Association.

In 2003 and 2004, Warren was the senior Staff Judge Advocate (senior attorney) for Coalition Forces in Iraq during Operation Iraqi Freedom.  Following the discovery of prisoner abuse at the Abu Ghraib detention facility, Warren was among those investigated for professional misconduct.  The extensive U.S. Army investigation, some of which remains classified, exonerated Warren.  The investigation was conducted by the Chief Trial Judge for the U.S. Army, who wrote in the unclassified executive summary of the investigation: "Not only was he not derelict in the performance of his duties in any measure, he was the most respected officer in the command."

Warren retired from the United States Army JAG Corps in 2007 after selection for Brigadier General.

Military Awards and Decorations  include:
Distinguished Service Medal; 
Defense Superior Service Medal; 
Legion of Merit; 
Bronze Star Medal (2); 
Defense Meritorious Service Medal; 
Meritorious Service Medal (3); 
Joint Service Commendation Medal; 
Army Commendation Medal (4); 
Joint Service Achievement Medal; 
Army Achievement Medal (2); 
Armed Forces Expeditionary Medal (2); 
Armed Forces Service Medal; and 
NATO Medal

Recent work 
Upon retirement from the army, Warren served as the deputy chief counsel for operations at the Federal Aviation Administration (FAA) from November 2007 to 2010.  He briefly left the FAA in 2010 to become the executive director of the American Inns of Court Foundation, a professional association dedicated to improving the skills, professionalism and ethics of the bench and bar.  He returned to the FAA to serve as the deputy chief counsel, the senior career executive attorney responsible for legal support to the agency.  Warren was named the "Transportation Lawyer of the Year" in 2012 by the Federal Bar Association.

Warren is a professorial lecturer in law at The George Washington University Law School, teaching courses on National Security Law and Nation Building and Rule of Law.  He is the co-holder of the Solf-Warren Honorary Chair of International and Operational Law at TJAGSA and is a frequent panelist and speaker at symposia on aviation, international, and operational law.  He is a member of the Governing Committee of the American Bar Association Forum on Air and Space Law and was a participant in the Operational Law Experts Roundtable that issued a report on the Gotovina judgment published in 2012 by the International Humanitarian Law Clinic at Emory University School of Law.  He is a former president of the Judge Advocates Association.

Publications 
Warren served as editor of the Operational Law Handbook and published articles in the Army Lawyer, Military Law Review, and various other military and legal professional publications.  Most recent article: "The Fog of Law: The Law of Armed Conflict in Operation Iraqi Freedom, 167 – 209" THE WAR IN IRAQ: A LEGAL ANALYSIS (Pedrozo ed., 2010) (Vol. 86, U.S. Naval War College International Law Studies).  He wrote the foreword to The Law of Armed Conflict: An Operational Approach (Aspen Casebook Series textbook) published in 2012 by Wolters Kluwer.

References

External links
Background info

United States Army officers
Living people
University of Florida College of Liberal Arts and Sciences alumni
Recipients of the Legion of Merit
Year of birth missing (living people)
Fredric G. Levin College of Law alumni